Pablo Rodríguez may refer to:

Footballers 
 Pablo Rodríguez (footballer, born 1955), born Pablo Rodríguez Flores, Spanish midfielder
 Pablo Rodríguez (footballer, born 1973), born Pablo de Jesús Rodríguez Álvarez, Mexican defender/midfielder
 Pablo Rodríguez (footballer, born 1975), born Pablo Jesús Rodríguez Méndez, Spanish midfielder
 Pablo Rodríguez (footballer, born 1977), born Pablo Martín Rodríguez, Argentine midfielder
 Pablo Rodríguez (footballer, born 1979), born Pablo Sebastián Rodríguez Carbajal, Uruguayan defender
 Pablo Rodríguez (footballer, born 1985), born Pablo Rodríguez Aracil, Spanish forward
 Pablo Rodríguez (footballer, born 1986), born Pablo Rodríguez Guzmán, Costa Rican defender in the 2003 FIFA U-17 World Championship
 Pablo Rodríguez (footballer, born 2001), born Pablo Rodríguez Delgado, Spanish forward

Others
Pablo Rodriguez (computer scientist) (born 1972), Spanish computer scientist and researcher
Pablo Rodriguez (Canadian politician) (born 1967), Member of Parliament
Pablo Rodríguez Regordosa, Mexican politician
Pablo Sebastián Rodríguez (born 1978), Argentine former basketball player
Pablo Rodríguez Grez, Chilean lawyer and politician, founder of the Fatherland and Liberty Nationalist Front
Pablo Rodriguez (author), Swiss author and entrepreneur